Page is an unincorporated community in Buchanan County, Virginia, in the United States.

History
A post office called Page was established in 1936, and remained in operation until it was discontinued in 1963. The community was named after Page, West Virginia.

References

Unincorporated communities in Buchanan County, Virginia
Unincorporated communities in Virginia